Melanesian music refers to the various musical traditions found across the vast region of Melanesia.

Vocal music is very common across Melanesia;   Hand gestures are an important part of many songs, and most traditional music is dance music.

Folk instruments include various kinds of drums and slit-log gongs, flutes, panpipes, stamping tubes, rattles, among others. Occasionally, European guitars and ukuleles are also used.

Notes

References
 Ammann, Raymond. 2012. Sounds of Secrets: Field Notes on Ritual Music and Musical Instruments on the Islands of Vanuatu. KlangKulturStudien – SoundCultureStudies, 7. Berlin: LIT Verlag.
 Crowe, Peter. 1994. Vanuatu (Nouvelles Hébrides): Singsing-Danis Kastom–Musiques Coutumières. AIMP XXXIV, CD-796. Genève: VDE-GALLO.
.
 Huffman, Kirk. 1996. Single bamboo flutes. In Joël Bonnemaison; Kirk Huffman; Christian Kaufmann, & Darrell Tryon (eds), Arts of Vanuatu. Bathurst: Crawford House Press. pp. 150–153.
 Stern, Monika. 2000. La permanence du changement ou les métissages musicaux au Vanuatu. Cahiers de Musiques Traditionnelles n°13 "Métissages". Genève: Georg/ADEM, 179–202.
 Zemp, Hugo. 1979. Aspects of ’Are’are Musical Theory. Ethnomusicology 23 (1): 5-48.
 Zemp, Hugo. 1994. ’Are’are Panpipe Ensembles. Paris: Le Chant du Monde.

See also
Melanesia

Melanesian music